Meyna laxiflora is a species of flowering plant in the family Rubiaceae. It has a world-wide distribution across tropical and subtropical regions.

Description
Meyna laxiflora is an armed shrub or small tree with greenish-yellow flowers. The calyx of the flower is cup shaped, and the fruits of the tree are round, fleshy, and edible. It flowers in January to March.

References 

Vanguerieae